Lieutenant-Colonel Sir Ranulph Robert Maunsell Bacon  (6 August 1906 – 30 March 1988) was a British police officer.

Bacon was born in Westgate-on-Sea, Kent, and educated at Tonbridge School and Queens' College, Cambridge. He joined the Metropolitan Police as a Constable in 1928 and was selected for Hendon Police College in 1934, passing out with the Baton of Honour.

At the outbreak of the Second World War, Bacon was eager to enlist, but was not given permission to do so. Finally in May 1940 he was commissioned into the British Army as a Provost Marshal on the General List. By December 1941, when he was mentioned in despatches for his service in the Western Desert, he held the local rank of Major, although his substantive rank was Lieutenant. He was later promoted Lieutenant-Colonel and in 1942 was appointed Deputy Provost Marshal of the Ninth Army.

In November 1943, he was seconded to the Colonial Police Service as Deputy Inspector-General of the Ceylon Police, and was promoted Inspector-General in 1944. His Deputy Inspector-General was John Waldron, another Hendon graduate who was later to succeed him as both Assistant Commissioner "A" and Deputy Commissioner of the Metropolitan Police.

In 1947, he returned to Britain as Chief Constable of the Devon County Constabulary, and held the post until his appointment as Assistant Commissioner "A" (Operations and Administration) of the Metropolitan Police on 1 November 1961. He was awarded the King's Police and Fire Services Medal in the 1953 New Year Honours. In 1963, he was appointed Assistant Commissioner "C" (Crime), in charge of the Criminal Investigation Department. At a press conference on 31 December 1964, he urged the public to "have a go" if they saw an armed robbery taking place, which was criticised as irresponsible by many. He was knighted in the 1966 New Year Honours.

In 1966, he briefly served as Deputy Commissioner, from 8 April to his retirement in October.

Footnotes

References
"Metropolis Post for Chief Constable", The Times, 29 June 1961
Biography, Who Was Who

External links
Photographic portraits of Bacon in the National Portrait Gallery

1906 births
1988 deaths
People from Westgate-on-Sea
People educated at Tonbridge School
Alumni of Queens' College, Cambridge
British Army General List officers
British Army personnel of World War II
British colonial police officers
Sri Lankan Inspectors General of Police
British Chief Constables
Assistant Commissioners of Police of the Metropolis
Deputy Commissioners of Police of the Metropolis
Knights Bachelor
English recipients of the Queen's Police Medal
People from British Ceylon